The Tennessee Valley Authority operates the Tennessee River system to provide a wide range of public benefits: year-round navigation, flood damage reduction, affordable electricity, improved water quality and water supply, recreation, and economic growth.

The TVA established the stairway of nine dams and locks that turned the Tennessee River into a 652-mile-long river highway. Dams and reservoirs on the main stem of the river include the following (listed from the farthest upstream to the farthest downstream):

 Fort Loudoun Dam impounds Fort Loudoun Lake
 Watts Bar Dam impounds Watts Bar Lake
 Chickamauga Dam impounds Chickamauga Lake
 Nickajack Dam impounds Nickajack Lake
 Guntersville Dam impounds Guntersville Lake
 Wheeler Dam impounds Wheeler Lake
 Wilson Dam impounds Wilson Lake
 Pickwick Landing Dam impounds Pickwick Lake
 Kentucky Dam impounds Kentucky Lake

Tributary dams and reservoirs include:

Apalachia Dam on the Hiwassee River forms Apalachia Reservoir
Blue Ridge Dam dams the Toccoa River, forming Blue Ridge Reservoir
Boone Dam on the South Fork Holston River forms Boone Reservoir
Chatuge Dam dams the Hiwassee River to form Chatuge Reservoir
Cherokee Dam on the Holston River forms Cherokee Lake
Douglas Dam on the French Broad River impounds Douglas Lake
Elk River Dam on the Elk River forms Woods Reservoir
Fontana Dam on the Little Tennessee River impounds Fontana Lake
Fort Patrick Henry Dam  on the South Fork Holston River impounds Fort Patrick Henry Reservoir
Hiwassee Dam dams the Hiwassee River immediately above Apalachia Reservoir
Melton Hill Dam on the Clinch River forms Melton Hill Reservoir
Nolichucky Dam on the Nolichucky River impounds Davy Crockett Lake
Normandy Dam on the Duck River impounds Normandy Reservoir
Norris Dam on the Clinch River impounds Norris Lake
Nottely Dam on the Nottely River forms Lake Nottely
Ocoee Dam No. 1 on the Ocoee River impounds Parksville Reservoir
Ocoee Dam No. 2 on the Ocoee River impounds Ocoee Lake No. 2
Ocoee Dam No. 3 on the Ocoee River impounds Ocoee Lake No. 3
South Holston Dam dams the South Fork Holston River, forming South Holston Reservoir
Tellico Dam on the Little Tennessee River forms Tellico Lake
Tims Ford Dam on the Elk River impounds Tims Ford Lake
Watauga Dam on the Watauga River impounds Watauga Lake
Wilbur Dam on the Watauga River impounds Wilbur Reservoir

External links
TVA Recreation Interactive Map

Tennessee River

 *

Tennessee River
 
Dams and reservoirs
Dams and reservoirs